Kadjebi District is one of the eight districts in Oti Region, Ghana. Originally created as an ordinary district assembly on 10 March 1989, which was created from the former Jasikan District Council, which it was established by Legislative Instrument (L.I.) 1465. The district assembly is located in the southern part of Oti Region and has Kadjebi as its capital town.

References

External links
 
 Kadjebi District on GhanaDistricts.com

Districts of the Oti Region